The Order of the Solomon Islands is an Order of Merit of the Solomon Islands. It was established under Royal Warrant in 1981 and amended on 5 October 1982. It is composed of three grades:
 Star of Solomon Islands (SSI)
 Cross of the Solomon Islands (CSI)
 Solomon Islands Medal (SIM)

This order is awarded to civilians or members of the armed forces, when a courageous act is involved.

References

Orders, decorations, and medals of the Solomon Islands
Solomon Islands, Order of the
Awards established in 1981
1981 establishments in the Solomon Islands